Edge of Darkness (a.k.a. Norway in Revolt) is a 1943 World War II film directed by Lewis Milestone that features Errol Flynn, Ann Sheridan, and Walter Huston. The feature is based on a script written by Robert Rossen which was adapted from the 1942 novel The Edge of Darkness by William  Woods.

Plot
In the Norwegian fishing village of Trollness, occupied by the Nazis, the Norwegian flag is observed flying high over the town by a passing patrol aircraft. The German troops sent to investigate discover that everyone in the village is dead, both German and Norwegian, including the German commander, Captain Koenig, in his office.

Previously, the local doctor, Martin Stensgard (Walter Huston) and his wife (Ruth Gordon) wanted to hold on to the pretense of gracious living and ignore the occupiers. The doctor would also prefer to stay neutral, but is torn. Kaspar Torgersen (Charles Dingle), his brother-in-law, the wealthy owner of the local fish cannery, collaborates with the Nazis. The doctor's daughter, Karen (Ann Sheridan), is involved with the resistance and is in a romantic relationship with its leader Gunnar Brogge (Errol Flynn). Johann (John Beal), the doctor's son, has just returned to town having been sent down from the university but is soon influenced by his Nazi-sympathizer uncle. Karen makes it known to the townsfolk that her brother is a "quisling".

The key group of resistance members, headed by Gunnar and Karen, anxiously await the secret arrival of arms from a British submarine. They hide the delivery of weapons in a cellar and call upon the townsfolk to delay violence until the opportune moment. Karen, on her way to a resistance meeting, is grabbed by a German soldier and disappears, while Gunnar frantically searches the town for her. She eventually appears at the meeting, clothes torn and face bruised, indicative that she has been raped. Gunnar loses his perspective after seeing what the Germans have done to the woman he loves and begins to go crazy, ordering that the fighting begin. Karen tells him that it is still not yet the time and as he calms down, the radio (which has only been receiving static for a week) finally picks up Churchill's broadcast from Britain, giving them all hope.

Karen's father leaves the meeting and, in anger, bludgeons a German soldier to death. Captain Koenig orders the suspected resistance leaders to be shot. On the morning of their execution they are forced to dig their own graves in the town square. They hear singing and discover the townsfolk have armed themselves with the smuggled guns, grenades and other weaponry. The local pastor, who previously had called violent resistance "murder," opens fire from the church tower and the townsfolk follow suit. They successfully capture the port, and load the women and children onto fishing boats bound for Britain. At the local hotel, which has been used since the occupation as German headquarters, the remaining soldiers prepare for the oncoming attack. Gunnar, Karen, her father, and the other resistance leaders and members make their way through the forest toward the hotel. Karen's brother cries to them from the hotel that they are walking into a machine gun crossfire trap set by the commander. He is shot dead for his efforts by the Germans. After a bloody battle, the rebels eventually capture the hotel and Captain Koenig commits suicide after writing a letter to his brother.

The story then reverts to the newly arrived German troops finding the dead bodies of both Germans and Norwegians littered about the town, forest and hotel. They declare that there is no one left alive. Karen and Gunnar, up in the hills, see a German soldier taking down the Norwegian flag and replacing it with a Nazi one. Karen shoots him dead with a scoped sniper rifle and the Nazi flag falls on his dead body. Gunnar, Karen, her father, and the surviving resistance members and townsfolk take shelter in the hills as the voice of President Franklin D. Roosevelt tells his listeners to look to Norway for understanding of the war and the hope and strength of the people.

Cast

 Errol Flynn as Gunnar Brogge
 Ann Sheridan as Karen Stensgard
 Walter Huston as Dr. Martin Stensgard
 Helmut Dantine as Captain Koenig
 Ruth Gordon as Anna Stensgard
 Judith Anderson as Gerd Bjarnesen
 Roman Bohnen as Lars Malken
 Monte Blue as Jens Peterson
 Tom Fadden as Hammer (uncredited)

 Francis Pierlot as Old Man Mortenson
 Art Smith as Knut
 Richard Fraser as Pastor Aalesen
 Morris Carnovsky as Sixtus Andresen
 Charles Dingle as Kaspar Torgersen
 Nancy Coleman as Katja, Koenig's Polish mistress
 John Beal as Johann Stensgard
 Kurt Katch as German Landing Party Captain
 Henry Brandon as Major Ruck

Production

Original Novel
Edge of Darkness was based on the debut novel of William Woods. Warner Bros. bought the film rights in January 1942 for $30,000. The novel was published on April 9, the second anniversary of the German invasion of Norway.

Development
Henry Blanke was assigned to produce, Robert Rossen to write the script and Lewis Milestone to direct. Milestone later told the press:
It is twelve years now since I made All Quiet on the Western Front. That film embodied the retrospective disillusionment toward another war. In Edge of Darkness we are making a picture that has done away with disillusionment. We know the enemy we are fighting and we are facing the stern realities of the present war. The moral in Edge of Darkness is that 'united we stand, divided we fall'. That is the keystone for victory in all the democracies.
"I can't think of a story about which I could be more enthusiastic," said Blanke about Edge of Darkness.

The job of writing the script was given to Robert Rossen. Milestone later said Rossen "hit on an idiom for the dialogue that had nothing to do with Norway but derived mainly from the language he knew best - the speechways of New York's East Side. Since nobody else knew the difference the idiom worked admirably."

Casting
Ann Sheridan and Humphrey Bogart were announced as stars.

Eventually Bogart dropped out and was replaced by Errol Flynn.

The cast included Helmut Dantine who had just signed a long-term contract with Warners following his appearance in Casablanca.

There were a large number of actors cast who were best known for their stage work, including Judith Anderson and Ruth Gordon.

Milestone later said "an extremely mixed cast gave some damned good performances."

Shooting
Shooting was to begin in August 1942 but was postponed for two weeks so Errol Flynn could recuperate from bad health.  He was meant to do this on his yacht but Hedda Hopper reported he slipped down to Mexico City with a friend for some hunting, and that he "hasn't wanted to do it [the film] from the first", in part because his role was relatively small. Bruce Cabot was listed as a possible replacement if Flynn did not return. Warners pressured Flynn and he eventually returned for filming.

(It was later reported that Flynn had signed a new contract with Warners for four films a year, one of which he was to also act as producer.)

Most of the film was shot in Warner Bros. studios at Burbank with some exteriors in the town of Monterey. Warners rented two of the biggest piers in Monterey and a fleet of Monterey sailing boats; they lined the streets with Norwegian and Nazi flags and signs and cast several locals as extras. The unit returned from Monterey on September 16 to resume studio shooting.

Erskine Caldwell reportedly operated as a technical adviser on the film because he had some experience of Norway.

During filming, Warners added six grave markers with the names of Nazi saboteurs recently executed in the US, for extra realism. Filming ended in November.

Edge of Darkness was one of a number being made in Hollywood set in occupied Europe, others being The Commandos Strike at Dawn and The Moon is Down.

Milestone later said "Flynn kept underrating himself. If you wanted to embarrass him, all you had to do was to tell him how great he was in a scene he'd just finished playing: he'd blush like a young girl and muttering 'I'm not an actor' would go away somewhere and sit down."

Music
Franz Waxman did the score. He used two main pieces, the Lutheran chorale "A Mighty Fortress is Our God" and the national hymn of Norway. According to one review, "the rest is frankly color orchestration and the necessary filling in. The result is a magnificent build up to an overwhelming emotional climax."

Reception
Contemporary reviews were positive. Bosley Crowther of The New York Times called the film "melodrama [but] strong melodrama, to be sure." Variety described it as "a dramatic, tense, emotion-stirring story of the ravaging of Norway, superbly acted by a fine cast and firmly directed by Lewis Milestone." Harrison's Reports called it "Excellent! ... Lewis Milestone's direction is masterful, and the performances, from the stars to the bit players, are superb." David Lardner of The New Yorker compared the film to The Moon Is Down, writing that both were worth seeing but that Edge of Darkness was slightly better due to rounder characterizations. Filmink magazine called it "definitely Errol's most communist (ish) movie."

The film was one of the five most requested movies by the US Army in April 1943 - the others being My Friend Flicka, Hit Parade of 1943, Flight for Freedom and Hello, Frisco, Hello. It was also given special screenings to the Sons of Norway organization.

Edge of Darkness was banned in Buenos Aires in 1943 because of its anti-Nazi stance.

Flynn was to follow the movie with To the Last Man (which became Northern Pursuit) and Captain Horatio Hornblower (which was postponed and then made with Gregory Peck).

Box Office
According to Warner Bros. records, the film earned $2,039,000 domestically and $1,630,000 foreign.

References

Notes

Bibliography

 Hanson, Patricia King, ed. American Film Institute Catalog of Motion Pictures Produced in the United States: Feature Films, 1941-1950. Berkeley, California: University of California Press, 1999. .
 Thomas, Tony, Rudy Behlmer and Clifford McCarty. The Films of Errol Flynn. New York: Citadel Press, 1969. .
 Woods, William Howard. Edge of Darkness: A Novel of Occupied Norway. New York: J.B. Lippincott Company. 1942.

External links

 
 
 
 
 Review of film at Variety
 

1943 films
1943 war films
American war films
American black-and-white films
1940s English-language films
Films scored by Franz Waxman
Films about Norwegian resistance movement
Films based on British novels
Films directed by Lewis Milestone
Films set in Norway
Films with screenplays by Robert Rossen
Warner Bros. films
World War II films made in wartime